The Château d'Aurignac is a ruined 13th century castle in the commune of Aurignac in the Haute-Garonne département of France.

The castle was built on a hill before 1240 by Bernard V, Counts of Comminges, and the village developed around it. Henry IV ordered the destruction of the castle in the early 17th century and, although it was still partly inhabited in 1627, it fell into disuse not long afterwards. All that remains today are the church, a well-restored keep on the peak of the hill and some of the ramparts, which have been incorporated into houses.

The property of the commune, it has been listed since 1979 as a monument historique by the French Ministry of Culture.

See also
List of castles in France

References

External links
 Ministry of Culture photo from before 1925

Castles in Haute-Garonne
Monuments historiques of Haute-Garonne
Houses completed in the 13th century
Ruined castles in Occitania (administrative region)